Jon Bru Pascal (born 18 October 1977 in Bera, Navarre) is a Spanish former professional road bicycle racer, who rode professionally between 2001 and 2008 for the , Kaiku and  teams.

Major results

2001
 1st Memorial Valenciaga
2002
 1st Classica do Seixal
2003
 1st Stage 3 Volta a Terras de Santa Maria
2004
 1st Voltas à Vila do Bombarral
2006
 Volta ao Distrito de Santarém
1st Points classification
1st Mountains classification
1st Stages 2 & 4

External links 
Profile at Euskaltel-Euskadi official website 

Spanish male cyclists
1977 births
Living people
People from Cinco Villas, Navarre
Cyclists from Navarre